Ladies Major League Wrestling (LMLW) was a women's professional wrestling company that operated from 1989–1992. Their cards were promoted under the Wild Women of Wrestling (WWOW) name.

History

Howard Brody incorporated the Ladies Major League Wrestling, Inc. (LMLW) company on October 27, 1989. The promotion featured women wrestlers that had previously competed in the World Wrestling Federation, National Wrestling Alliance, American Wrestling Association, and Powerful Women of Wrestling promotions, along with several independent women wrestlers. Their matches were aired under the "Wild Women of Wrestling" banner on the Universal Wrestling Federation television series Fury Hour and sold on home video.

In 1989, Brody and business partner Craig Cohen hired Luna Vachon as the head booker of the company.

Championships

LMLW World Championship
LMLW originally planned on having former WWF Women's Champion Wendi Richter face NWA United States Women's Champion Misty Blue Simmes to determine the first Ladies Major League Wrestling World Champion; however, Simmes and her troupe of wrestlers (including Linda Dallas and Kat LeRoux) turned down the offer to work for LMLW's initial taping. Instead, in April 1990, Bambi won the "Collision of Champions Battle Royal" to crown the first Ladies Major League Wrestling World Champion (also referred to as the Wild Women of Wrestling Champion).

After Bambi, Peggy Lee Leather, and Malia Hosaka missed their plane from a Ladies Professional Wrestling Association television taping in Las Vegas, Nevada to the LMLW taping in Key West, Florida on November 30, 1990, booker Luna Vachon re-booked the LMLW tapings for the following evening (December 1, 1990) and had Bambi drop the LMLW World Championship to her. Leather and Hosaka were also punished by Luna's booking decisions at the taping.

LMLW International Championship
Peggy Lee Leather held the Ladies Major League Wrestling International Championship, but as a result of missing her flight to an LMLW taping on November 30, 1990, she was forced to lose it to Rockin' Robin on December 1, 1990.

LMLW Florida/Junior Championship
Malia Hosaka held the Ladies Major League Wrestling Florida Championship (also billed as Ladies Major League Wrestling Junior Championship) and lost it to Penelope Paradise on the same night when Bambi and Peggy Lee Leather also dropped their titles.

LMLW Tag Team Championship
The Glamour Girls (Leilani Kai and Judy Martin) held the Ladies Major League Wrestling Tag Team Championship.

WWOW Television Championship
Luna Vachon held the Wild Women of Wrestling Television Championship.

Other championships
The organization also recognized Wendi Richter as the World Champion/Universally Recognized Champion (separate from the LMLW World Championship), Candi Devine as the North American Champion, Peggy Lee Leather as the Southern States Champion, Heidi Lee Morgan as the Northeastern Champion, Bambi as the Georgia Champion, Penelope Paradise as the Florida Champion (separate from the LMLW Florida Championship), Sindy Paradise as the Caribbean Champion, Diane Von Hoffman as the European Champion, Rustee "The Foxx" Thomas as the Virginia Commonwealth Champion, and Sheila Fox as the Australian Champion.

Cadillac Pink was recognized as the 1989 Rookie of the Year.

Alumni

Wrestlers

Angie Maurin
Ariel Dee (Denise Klimowicz)
Babyface Nellie
Bambi (Selina Majors)
Banshee (Penny Mitchell)
B.J. Calhoun
Brenda Lee
Cadillac Pink (Tina Smith, also referred to as Pink Cadillac)
Candi Devine (Candace Rummel)
"Dirty" Debbie Drake (Debbie Killian, aka Debbie Malenko)
Diane Von Hoffman
Heidi Lee Morgan
Joanne McCartney
Judy Martin (Judy Hardee)
Kat LeRoux
Leilani Kai (Patricia Schroeder)
Luna Vachon (Gertrude Vachon) (also backstage interviewer)
Malia Hosaka
Misty Blue Simmes (Diane Syms)
Peggy Lee Leather
Penelope Paradise (Kim Ollis-Sacks)
Rockin' Robin (Robin Smith)
Rustee "the Foxx" Thomas
Sheila Fox
Sindy Paradise
Spectre (Terri Shane)
Taylor Made (Terri Poch)
Tina Moretti (Lisa Moretti)
Vivan St. John
Wendi Richter

Tag Teams
The Glamour Girls (Leilani Kai and Judy Martin with Abdullah Farouk, Jr.)
The Mystics (Spectre and Banshee)
The Power Team (Heidi Lee Morgan, Sindy Paradise, and Taylor Made)

Other on-air talent

Managers
Abdullah Farouk, Jr.
Dick Slater

Announcers
Bill Cardille
Bruno Sammartino

References

Independent professional wrestling promotions based in Florida
Women's professional wrestling promotions